The 2007-2008 Israeli Basketball Super League season was the 54th season of top division basketball in Israel.

Regular season

Standings 

Source: Official Ligat HaAl website
Pts=Points, P=Matches played, W=Matches won, L=Matches lost, F=Points for, A=Points against, D=Points difference.
1.Due to a firecracker thrown into the court during the match between Hapoel Holon and Hapoel Jerusalem, Holon lost technically 20-0 and was not awarded with any points.

Final four 
See 2007-2008 Israeli Final Four

Awards

Regular season MVP 
  P. J. Tucker (Hapoel Holon)

First team 
  Meir Tapiro (Bnei HaSharon)
  P. J. Tucker (Hapoel Holon)
  Otis Hill (Ironi Nahariya)
  Terence Morris (Maccabi Tel Aviv)
  Jamie Arnold (Hapoel Jerusalem)

Coach of the season 
  Miki Dorsman (Hapoel Holon)

Sixth player of the season 
  Omri Casspi (Maccabi Tel Aviv)

Rising star 
  Nir Cohen (Ironi Ramat Gan)

Individual statistical awards 
 Top scorer -  Steve Burtt (Elitzur Ashkelon) (20.8 Per game)
 Top Rebounder -  Ndudi Ebi (Bnei HaSharon) (8.5)
 Top Assists -  Lamont Jones (Hapoel Gilboa/Afula) (5.4)
 Top Steals -  Yogev Ohayon (Hapoel Galil Elyon) (2.0)

Final MVP 
  Terence Morris (Maccabi Tel Aviv)

Israeli Basketball Premier League seasons
Israeli
League